Gordon Stephen Crook (11 October 1921 – 26 August 2011) was a visual artist working across the fields of ceramics, textiles, printmaking, painting and drawing.

Early life
Born in Richmond, Surrey, England, Crook's parents separated when he was four and he moved with his mother from London to Sussex. He grew up in Sussex, moving between foster homes, and then attended boarding school in Chichester. He joined the merchant navy at 17, and served in the Royal Air Force during World War II.

Training
In 1945 Crook received a grant to study at St Martin's School, London. In 1948 he enrolled at the Central School of Art, known at the time for its innovative work in textiles. Crook graduated with a degree in textile design and began tutoring at the Central School, before being employed as a lecturer.

Career
After completing his training Crook lived in London for 22 years, working as a freelance designer and teaching at the Central School and the Royal College of Art. He also exhibited his own work, ceramics, drawings, paintings, and tapestries. The artist once said:

Because I work in a lot of media, people can't get to grips with my work. The point is that oneself as an artist remains consistent. My object is to end up with something that I haven't seen before, to get an image which I could not have imagined

In 1972, aged 51, Crook decided to emigrate to New Zealand and settled in Wellington, where he spent the rest of his life. He continued making art until his death in 2011, aged 89, and was known for his diverse and prodigious output.

In 1979 Crook was commissioned to produce a set of 20 banners for the Miles Warren-designed New Zealand Embassy in Washington. Hanging in the Great Hall of the embassy building the banners measure five metres by 1 metre and feature South Pacific imagery and heraldry. The banners were made by Nancye Smeaton, manager of the then-New Zealand Ballet and Opera Trust production unit. Between 1981 and 1983 Crook worked on a series of larger banners for the entrance foyer of the Michael Fowler Centre in Wellington.

Crook designed and wove some of his own tapestries; others he collaborated on with other professional weavers. His suite of small tapestries 18 Maritimes for example, in the collection of The Dowse Art Museum were designed by Crook, inspired by 18 small collages made using colour photocopying techniques, and then woven over 1995–1996 by Sue Batten at the Victorian Tapestry Workshop. Crook also collaborated extensively with weaver Lesley Nicholls, producing more than 20 tapestries together.

While he worked across many formats – including pastel drawings, painting, collages, paper-making and screenprinting – Crook was best-known and most recognized for his textile work. Writing in 1980 critic Neil Rowe observed:

When assessing a talent as multi-faceted as Crook's it is difficult to single out one aspect for consideration above the others. In my opinion, his work with textiles and fabrics constitutes his most significant contribution to contemporary art.
... In New Zealand there is no designer in this field who is as highly qualified or as accomplished as Gordon Crook. In terms of colour and design, his tapestries are by far the most consistently exciting work in the medium made here.

Crook received significant support from Jim Barr and James Mack, two early directors of The Dowse Art Museum in Lower Hutt, who collected and exhibited his work. 
 
Significant solo exhibitions of Crook's work include:

1993–1996 An Introduction to the world of Gordon Crook, touring throughout New Zealand
2011 Gordon Crook: 18 Maritimes, The Dowse Art Museum

Publications:
 Catalogue of an exhibition of tapestries and drawings based on the theme of Adam and Eve, Wellington: Galerie Legend, 1978 
Gordon Crook, Wellington: Brooker Gallery, 1993. 
Biography of the mind Wellington: Page Blackie Gallery, 2013.

Gordon Crook: A Life of Art
In 2010 a documentary about Crook, Gordon Crook: A Life of Art, by director Clare O'Leary premiered at New Zealand's International Film Festival. The documentary traced Crook's life from his early years in foster care to his time as a London Central School of Art lecturer to his decades in Wellington and featured interviews with Crook, his friends, supporters, students and dealer representatives. The documentary also features autobiographical narrative, including poems written by Crook.

Further information:
 Trailer for 'Gordon Crook: A Life of Art'

Death
Crook died in Wellington on 26 August 2011.

Collections
Crook's work is held in collections across New Zealand.

Works in the collection of the Auckland Art Gallery
Works in the collection of Christchurch Art Gallery
Works in the collection of The Dowse Art Museum
Works in the collection of the Museum of New Zealand Te Papa Tongarewa

References

1921 births
2011 deaths
New Zealand textile artists
New Zealand painters
Textile artists
English painters
New Zealand printmakers
English printmakers
People from Richmond, London
English emigrants to New Zealand
Royal Air Force personnel of World War II
Alumni of Saint Martin's School of Art
Alumni of the Central School of Art and Design
20th-century textile artists
21st-century textile artists
20th-century New Zealand artists
20th-century New Zealand male artists
21st-century New Zealand artists
21st-century New Zealand male artists